The Dupont Circle Building is a landmark art deco building on the south end of Dupont Circle in Washington DC. The entrance is on 1350 Connecticut Avenue NW.

It was designed by architect Mihran Mesrobian, originally as an apartment building. In 1942 it was converted to offices. Later in the 1940s it was the head office of the United Nations Relief and Rehabilitation Administration.

The American Institute of Architects's guide to the architecture of Washington DC assesses the Dupont Circle Building's bas-relief ornament as "genius" and judges that in respect of the interplay between ornament and geometry, "it outdoes New York's famous Flatiron Building."

References

Dupont Circle
Embassy Row